Orthetrum latihami, is an African freshwater dragonfly species. Due to its scarce distribution, the range of species can only be described as central African.

See also 
 Orthetrum

References 

Libellulidae
Insects described in 1966
Insects of Africa